Ueslei Raimundo Pereira da Silva or better known as Ueslei (born 19 April 1972 in Salvador, Brazil) is a Brazilian former football player.

Ueslei played for Bahia, Vitória and Atlético Mineiro in the Campeonato Brasileiro.

Club statistics

Honors

Individual Honors
 Brazilian 2nd Division League Top Scorer: 1999
 J.League Top Scorer: 2003

Club Honors
 Campeonato Baiano: 1991, 1993, 1994, 1997, 1998, 1999
 Copa Master da Conmebol
 Copa do Nordeste: 1997
 J.League Cup: 2008

References

External links

1972 births
Living people
Brazilian footballers
Brazilian expatriate footballers
Sportspeople from Salvador, Bahia
Nagoya Grampus players
Sanfrecce Hiroshima players
Oita Trinita players
Sociedade Esportiva Palmeiras players
Esporte Clube Bahia players
Sport Club Internacional players
Guarani FC players
São Paulo FC players
Clube Atlético Mineiro players
Esporte Clube Vitória players
Expatriate footballers in Japan
Campeonato Brasileiro Série B players
J1 League players
Association football forwards
Esporte Clube Jacuipense managers